Harish Janartha is an Indian politician and current MLA of Shimla Assembly constituency, Himachal Pradesh.

Janartha won the 2022 Himachal Pradesh Legislative Assembly election defeating former MLA Suresh Bhardwaj. With Janartha's win, the INC won the constituency after 15 years. Janartha, in 2017, contested the 2017 elections from Shimla as an Independent candidate but lost. He joined back Indian National Congress in 2019.

Janartha graduated from Panjab University in 1986.

References 

Indian National Congress politicians
Living people
Year of birth missing (living people)